KBJX is an adult hits formatted broadcast radio station.  The station is licensed to Mertzon, Texas and serves San Angelo in Texas.  KBJX is owned and operated by William W. McCutchen, III.

References

External links
103-5 Jack FM on Facebook

2016 establishments in Texas
Adult hits radio stations in the United States
Jack FM stations
Radio stations established in 2016
BJX